Tom Dillmann (born 6 April 1989 in Mulhouse) is a French racing driver set to compete in the 2023 FIA World Endurance Championship for the Vanwall Racing Team. He is well known for winning the German Formula Three Championship in the 2010 season and the Formula V8 3.5 Championship in the 2016 3.5 season.

Career

Karting and Formula Renault
As the son of retired racing driver, mechanic and team manager Gerard Dillmann, Tom Dillmann started his career by winning the regional Alsace soapbox championship in 1999. He raced go-karts from 2000 to 2002 in the minime and junior classes, and won a regional title and also achieved fourth place in the French championship. In 2003, Dillmann tested a prototype made by his father. He drove the car, powered by a motorbike engine, on circuit and ice.

In 2004, Dillmann entered the Formula Renault 1600 Belgium series with his family-run Tom Team. He finished fifth in the championship with three podiums, including a victory at Spa-Francorchamps. He also contested selected races of the Formula Renault Monza and Formula Junior 1600 Spain championships, taking a podium finish in the latter. Dillmann moved into the Formula Renault Eurocup in 2005, as part of a three-car Prema Powerteam effort alongside Kamui Kobayashi and Patrick Rocha. Dillmann contested the first three meetings with Prema, before moving to Cram Competition for the next two meetings. Having failed to score points to that point, Dillmann elected to stand down from his drive due to a lack of experience. He also contested three meetings of the French championship, but failed to score any points.

He returned to the European series at the start of the 2006 season; again as part of a three-car team, this time with SG Formula, along with Sten Pentus and Carlo van Dam. Alongside his Eurocup commitments, Dillmann contested the majority of the French Formula Renault Championship. In the Eurocup, Dillmann achieved his first podium at the third meeting of the season, as he finished second behind Dani Clos at Misano. He added two further second places at the final meeting of the season in Barcelona, finishing behind eventual series champion Filipe Albuquerque on both occasions. Dillmann finished eighth in the championship. In the French championship, Dillmann finished in tenth place after taking two consecutive victories late in the season, at Le Mans and Magny-Cours.

Formula Three
Prior to the 2007 season, Dillmann became a member of the Red Bull Junior Team, alongside fellow French driver Jean-Karl Vernay. With added financial support from Red Bull, Dillmann entered the Formula 3 Euro Series with ASM, joining Romain Grosjean, Nico Hülkenberg and Kamui Kobayashi at the team. Dillmann missed the opening meeting of the year after a pre-season testing crash left him with a broken sternum and vertebra, but finished the season ninth overall after taking three podiums during the season. Following the season, Dillmann became the rookie driver for A1 Team Switzerland in A1 Grand Prix; he was a member of the team at the Taupo and Eastern Creek rounds in 2008.

Dillmann remained in the Euro Series for the 2008 season, again with Red Bull backing, and rejoined his former Formula Renault team SG Formula, who were moving up to the Euro Series for the first time. Dillmann set the fastest lap on the first day of testing at Estoril, but could not repeat this form early in the season; his best finish in the first three meetings was a fifteenth-place finish at Hockenheim. This series of results cost him his place on the Red Bull Junior Team. Dillmann returned to the series later in the season at the Nürburgring, with the Jo Zeller Racing team, after they parted with Michael Klein. He qualified third for the Saturday race and finished the race in the same position, before taking a fifth place in the Sunday race. Dillmann did not continue with the team beyond that meeting, and was classified 18th in the final drivers' championship standings. Instead, Dillmann ended the season in the Italian Formula Three Championship with the Europa Corse team. In three meetings, Dillmann recorded two second places and two third places, and ended the season in seventh place in the championship.

Despite this, Dillmann started the 2009 season without a drive. After sitting on the sidelines in the first half of the year, Dillmann replaced Kevin Mirocha at HBR Motorsport in the Euro Series; ahead of the Oschersleben meeting of the championship. He finished outside the top 20 in both races, but remained with the team for the following event at the Nürburgring, where he recorded a best result of fourteenth place. Dillmann also contested the final two meetings of the season; he competed at Dijon with Prema Powerteam, and again with HBR Motorsport, at Hockenheim. Aside from his Euro Series commitments, Dillmann raced in the final three meetings of the German Formula Three Championship with Neuhauser Racing; joining the series at the Nürburgring. Dillmann was on the pace immediately, taking pole position for the second race of the weekend; he finished both races on the podium, with a third place and a victory in the second race. Dillmann also won races at the Sachsenring and Oschersleben, to finish sixth in the drivers' championship, having competed in just six races.

Dillmann competed full-time in German Formula Three in the 2010 Formel 3 season, moving to the HS Technik team. At the first meeting of the year at Oschersleben, Dillmann won the second race on-the-road, before being demoted to seventh after a post-race penalty for jumping the start. Dillmann's first two victories of the season came at the following meeting, at the Sachsenring. Dillmann won both races during the weekend, to move into the championship lead. Dillmann extended his championship lead after a third victory of the season, from pole position, at Hockenheim. A strong weekend for Van Amersfoort Racing's Daniel Abt at Assen moved him ahead of Dillmann in the championship, but Dillmann took the championship lead once again after a double win at the Nürburgring. Consistent points finishes were the key to Dillmann's second half of the campaign, going on a run of five races without a podium, but his championship lead was slightly reduced by Abt. Dillmann achieved another victory at the Nürburgring during the championship's second visit to the circuit, and held a nine-point championship lead over Abt into the final meeting of the season at Oschersleben. Dillmann finished second to Abt in the opening race at Oschersleben, to reduce the advantage to seven points; but Dillmann ultimately prevailed, as Abt failed to score points in the final race due to a broken lambda sensor. Dillmann, who had earlier retired with a fuel pump failure, became the first French driver to win the championship title. He was invited to a Formula Renault 3.5 Series test at Motorland Aragón in October 2010, as a result of becoming champion in German Formula Three. Dillmann set the third-quickest time during the test, and best of all newcomers, while driving for the ISR Racing team.

Dillmann also contested three events in the Italian Formula Three Championship; at the opening meeting at Misano, Dillmann took a fourth place and a second place for Scuderia Victoria. He returned for the final two meetings with EuroInternational, failing to score a point. He finished the championship thirteenth overall. Dillmann contested two meetings of the Formula 3 Euro Series in 2011; he competed for Carlin at Hockenheim, and Motopark at the Red Bull Ring, achieving a best result of third place in the third race at the Red Bull Ring, taking his first Euro Series podium since 2008. Dillmann also contested the Zolder round of the German Formula Three Championship, competing in the Trophy class for older-specification machinery. Dillmann won one race, and finished third in the other.

GP3 Series
In March 2011, Dillmann joined the Carlin team for the 2011 season, partnering Conor Daly and Leonardo Cordeiro in the team. At the opening round of the season in Istanbul, Dillmann qualified on pole position for the first race, recording two laps good enough for the top spot. Dillmann made a poor start to the race, but eventually finished the race in third position. Following the event however, Dillmann was dropped by the team; at the mid-season test at the Hungaroring, Dillmann joined the Addax Team, and remained with the team into the third round of the season, in Valencia. Dillmann finished in the points at three successive meetings – at the Nürburgring, the Hungaroring and Spa-Francorchamps – and finished the season in fourteenth place in the drivers' championship.

GP2 Series
Following the end of the 2011 GP3 season, Dillmann tested a GP2 car for the iSport International team, during the post-season tests at Jerez and Barcelona. He finished both races in the points, as he finished in sixth place in the first race before a third place in the second race. His results were the second-best by a GP3 graduate, after James Calado, and earned Dillmann €10,000 from series tyre manufacturer Pirelli. After testing for Ocean Racing Technology and the Rapax Team during the preseason tests, Dillmann joined Rapax ahead of the 2012 season-opening event at Sepang. He took his first GP2 win in the sprint race of the third round of the championship, held in Bahrain. After failing to score in the following six races, he lost his seat for the round at Silverstone to Daniël de Jong, who had previously taken the seat of his teammate, Ricardo Teixeira. He returned to racing action for the next round at Hockenheim, however, as De Jong was competing in a clashing Auto GP World Series event in Brazil, but then lost it again for the following round in Hungary due to budgetary problems. He ended the season 15th in the standings; the highest-placed driver not to complete the full season.

For 2013, it was announced that Dillmann would join new team Russian Time alongside GP2 returnee Sam Bird. He scored two pole positions and fastest laps apiece and finished tenth overall, eight places behind Bird.

In 2014, although confirmed at Russian Time, the death of the team principal in January had the consequence that he lost his seat; Dillmann contested eight rounds of the championship with Arden International and Caterham, finishing on the podium in the sprint race at Catalunya and achieving the fastest lap in the feature race at the Hungaroring.

Formula 3.5
In 2015, Dillmann joined the series with Jagonya Ayam with Carlin. He achieved a pole position in the final round at Jerez and finished seventh overall, despite scoring no victories.

The following season, Dillmann switched to AVF. Taking two race wins, five pole positions and two fastest laps, Dillmann secured the championship at the final round, seven points ahead of nearest challenger Louis Delétraz.

Formula E
In August 2015, Dillmann partook in pre-season testing with Team Aguri along with fellow former GP2 racer Stefano Coletti.

In April 2017, Dillmann partook in the free practice session with Venturi at the Mexico City ePrix in place of Stéphane Sarrazin. Later that month, Venturi announced Dillmann would make his racing debut at the Paris ePrix in place of Maro Engel.

On 8 October 2018, Dillmann was announced as a NIO Driver for season 5.

In May 2021, Dillmann was announced as the simulator and reserve driver for the Jaguar Racing Formula E team.

World Endurance Championship 
On 11 January 2023, it was revealed that Dillmann would compete in the Le Mans Hypercar class in the 2023 FIA World Endurance Championship for Vanwall Racing Team driving alongside Esteban Guerrieri and 1997 Formula One World Champion Jacques Villeneuve.

Racing record

Career summary

† As Dillmann was a guest driver he was ineligible to score points.
* Season still in progress.

Complete Formula 3 Euro Series results

† As Dillmann was a guest driver, he was ineligible to score points.

Complete GP3 Series results
(key) (Races in bold indicate pole position)

 Did not finish, but was classified as he had completed more than 90% of the race distance.

Complete GP2 Series results
(key) (Races in bold indicate pole position) (Races in italics indicate fastest lap)

† Driver did not finish the race, but was classified as he completed over 90% of the race distance.

Complete GP2 Final results
(key) (Races in bold indicate pole position) (Races in italics indicate fastest lap)

Complete Formula V8 3.5 Series results
(key) (Races in bold indicate pole position) (Races in italics indicate fastest lap)

Complete FIA World Endurance Championship results
(key) (Races in bold indicate pole position; races in italics indicate fastest lap)

† As Dillmann was a guest driver he was ineligible to score points.
* Season still in progress.

Complete Blancpain GT Series Sprint Cup results
(key) (Races in bold indicate pole position; races in italics indicate fastest lap)

Complete Formula E results
(key) (Races in bold indicate pole position; races in italics indicate fastest lap)

Complete Super Formula results
(key) (Races in bold indicate pole position) (Races in italics indicate fastest lap)

24 Hours of Le Mans results

References

External links

 
 

1989 births
Living people
Alsatian-German people
Sportspeople from Mulhouse
French racing drivers
Belgian Formula Renault 1.6 drivers
Italian Formula Renault 1.6 drivers
French Formula Renault 2.0 drivers
Formula Renault Eurocup drivers
German Formula Three Championship drivers
Italian Formula Three Championship drivers
Formula 3 Euro Series drivers
French GP3 Series drivers
GP2 Series drivers
Porsche Supercup drivers
World Series Formula V8 3.5 drivers
Formula E drivers
FIA World Endurance Championship drivers
24 Hours of Le Mans drivers
Super Formula drivers
24H Series drivers
Prema Powerteam drivers
Carlin racing drivers
ART Grand Prix drivers
Arden International drivers
A1 Grand Prix drivers
ADAC GT Masters drivers
Blancpain Endurance Series drivers
Cram Competition drivers
Jo Zeller Racing drivers
Rapax Team drivers
Russian Time drivers
Motopark Academy drivers
Caterham Racing drivers
Walter Lechner Racing drivers
Venturi Grand Prix drivers
Kolles Racing drivers
NIO 333 FE Team drivers
Team LeMans drivers
Extreme Speed Motorsports drivers
AV Formula drivers
Signature Team drivers
ISport International drivers
EuroInternational drivers
SG Formula drivers
Neuhauser Racing drivers
Le Mans Cup drivers
Porsche Carrera Cup Germany drivers